Acanthogalathea squamosa is an extinct species of squat lobster in the family Galatheidae. It was extant during the Eocene.

References

Squat lobsters
Crustaceans described in 2007